The International Journal of Bank Marketing is a peer-reviewed academic journal in the field of financial services marketing. It was established in 1983 by MCB University Press (now Emerald Group Publishing).

The journal has an Impact Factor of 5.1 and is ranked as an A journal by the Australian Business Deans Council (ABDC).

References 

Marketing journals
Finance journals
Publications established in 1983
English-language journals
Emerald Group Publishing academic journals
7 times per year journals